This list of the Cenozoic life of Nebraska contains the various prehistoric life-forms whose fossilized remains have been reported from within the US state of Nebraska and are between 66 million and 10,000 years of age.

A

 Acer
 †Acer minor
 †Achlyoscapter
  Acipenser
 †Aciprion
 †Aciprion formosum
 Acris
 †Acris crepitans – or unidentified comparable form
  †Acritohippus
 †Acritohippus isonesus
 †Acritohippus tertius
 †Adeloblarina – or unidentified comparable form
 †Adjidaumo
 †Adjidaumo intermedius – type locality for species
 †Adjidaumo maximus – type locality for species
 †Adjidaumo minimus
 †Adjidaumo minutus
  †Aelurodon
 †Aelurodon asthenostylus
 †Aelurodon ferox
 †Aelurodon mcgrewi – type locality for species
 †Aelurodon stirtoni
 †Aelurodon taxoides
 †Aelurodon wheelerianus – or unidentified comparable form
  †Aepycamelus
 †Aepycamelus major
 †Aepycamelus robustus
 Agkistrodon
 †Agkistrodon contortix – or unidentified comparable form
 †Agnotocastor
 †Agnotocastor readingi – type locality for species
  †Agriochoerus
 †Agriochoerus antiquus
  †Agriotherium
  †Aletomeryx
 †Aletomeryx gracilis – type locality for species
 †Aletomeryx marslandensis – type locality for species
 †Alforjas
 †Alilepus
 †Alilepus vagus
  Alligator
 †Alligator mcgrewi – type locality for species
 †Alligator mefferdi – type locality for species
 †Alligator thomsoni – type locality for species
 †Allomys
 †Allomys harkseni
 †Allophaiomys
 †Alluvisorex
 †Alluvisorex arcadentes – or unidentified comparable form
  Alnus
 †Alphagaulus
 †Alphagaulus tedfordi – type locality for species
 †Alphagaulus vetus
 †Alwoodia
 †Alwoodia magna – or unidentified comparable form
 †Ambrosia
 †Ambystoma
 †Ambystoma maculatum
 †Ambystoma minshalli – type locality for species
 †Ambystoma priscum – type locality for species
  †Ambystoma tigrinum
  †Amebelodon
 †Amebelodon fricki – type locality for species
 †Ameiseophis
 †Ameiseophis robinsoni
 Amia
 †Amia calva
 Ammospermophilus
 †Ammospermophilus junturensis
 †Amphechinus
  †Amphicyon
 †Amphicyon frendens – type locality for species
 †Amphicyon galushai – type locality for species
 †Amphicyon ingens
  †Amphimachairodus
 †Amphimachairodus coloradensis
 †Anchigyps
 †Anchigyps voorhiesi
 †Anchitheriomys
 †Anchitheriomys fluminis
 †Anchitheriomys nanus
 †Anchitheriomys stouti – type locality for species
  †Anchitherium
  †Andrias
 †Andrias matthewi – type locality for species
 †Anilioides
 †Anilioides nebraskensis – type locality for species
 †Ankylodon
 †Ankylodon annectens
 †Antecalomys
 †Antecalomys phthanus – type locality for species
 †Antesorex
 †Antesorex wilsoni – type locality for species
 Antrozous – or unidentified comparable form
 Apalone
 †Apalone miocaenus – type locality for species
 †Apalone spinifera
 †Apatemys
 †Apatemys downsi – or unidentified related form
  †Aphelops
 †Aphelops megalodus
 †Aphelops mutilus – type locality for species
 †Apletotomeus
 †Apletotomeus crassus – type locality for species
 Aplodinotus
  †Aplodinotus grunniens
 †Apternodus
 †Aramornis
 †Aramornis longurio – type locality for species
 Aramus
  †Archaeocyon
 †Archaeocyon leptodus
 †Archaeocyon pavidus
 †Archaeohippus
 †Archaeohippus penultimus – type locality for species
 †Archaeolagus
 †Archaeolagus primigenius – or unidentified comparable form
  †Archaeotherium
 †Archaeotherium mortoni
  †Arctodus
 †Arctodus simus
 Arctomys
 †Arctomys vetus
 †Arctonasua
 †Arctonasua eurybates – type locality for species
 †Arctonasua gracilis – type locality for species
 †Arctonasua minima – type locality for species
 Ardea
 †Arikareeomys
 †Arikareeomys skinneri – type locality for species
 Arizona
 †Arizona voorhiesi – type locality for species
 †Arretotherium
 †Arretotherium acridens
 †Arretotherium fricki – type locality for species
 †Artemisia
 †Astrohippus
 Atractosteus
 †Atractosteus spatula
 †Aulolithomys
 †Aulolithomys bounites

B

 Baiomys
 Balearica
  †Barbourofelis
 †Barbourofelis fricki
 †Barbourofelis morrisi – type locality for species
 †Barbourofelis whitfordi – type locality for species
 †Barbouromeryx
 †Barbouromeryx trigonocorneus
 Bassariscus
 †Bassariscus antiquus – type locality for species
 †Bassariscus minimus – type locality for species
 †Bassariscus ogallalae – type locality for species
 †Bathornis
 †Bathornis veredus
 †Bathygenys
 †Bensonomys
 †Bensonomys meadensis
 Betula – or unidentified comparable form
 Bison
  †Bison latifrons
 †Blackia
 †Blacktops – type locality for genus
 †Blacktops latidens – type locality for species
 †Blacktops longinares – type locality for species
 Blarina
 †Blarina brevicauda
  †Blastomeryx
 †Blastomeryx gemmifer – type locality for species
 †Bootherium
  †Bootherium bombifrons – type locality for species
 †Boreortalis
 †Boreortalis phengitis – type locality for species
  †Borophagus
 †Borophagus diversidens
 †Borophagus pugnator
 †Borophagus secundus
  †Bothriodon
 †Bothriodon americanus
 †Bouromeryx
 †Bouromeryx americanus
 †Bouromeryx submilleri – type locality for species
  †Brachycrus
 †Brachycrus buwaldi
 †Brachycrus siouense – type locality for species
 †Brachycrus wilsoni – type locality for species
 †Brachyerix
 †Brachyerix incertis – type locality for species
 †Brachyerix macrotis
 †Brachyerix richi – type locality for species
 †Brachyopsigale
 †Brachyopsigale dubius – or unidentified comparable form
 †Brachypsalis
 †Brachypsalis hyaenoides – type locality for species
 †Brachypsalis matutinus – type locality for species
 †Brachypsalis modicus
 †Brachypsalis obliquidens – type locality for species
 †Brachypsalis pachycephalus
  †Brachyrhynchocyon
 †Brachyrhynchocyon dodgei
 †Bretzia – tentative report
 †Brontops
 †Brontops brachycephalus
 †Brontops dispar – type locality for species
 Bufo
 †Bufo cognatus
 †Bufo hibbardi
 †Bufo holmani – type locality for species
 †Bufo kuhrei – type locality for species
 †Bufo pliocompactilis
 †Bufo repentinus
 †Bufo rexroadensis
 †Bufo spongifrons – or unidentified comparable form
 †Bufo valentinensis – type locality for species
 †Buisnictis
 †Buisnictis burrowsi
 †Buisnictis schoffi
 Burhinus
 †Burhinus lucorum – type locality for species
  Buteo
 †Buteo conterminus – type locality for species
 †Buteo typhoius

C

 †Calamagras
 †Calamagras angulatus
 †Calamagras murivorus
 †Calamagras platyspondyla – type locality for species
 †Calippus
 †Calippus cerasinus
 †Calippus large informal
 †Calippus martini
 †Calippus placidus
 †Calippus proplacidus
 †Calippus regulus
  †Camelops
 †Camelops hesternus
 †Campestrallomys
 †Campestrallomys annectens – type locality for species
 †Campestrallomys siouxensis – type locality for species
 Canis
  †Canis dirus
 †Canis edwardii
 †Canis ferox
 †Canis latrans
 †Canis lepophagus
 †Capacikala
  †Capromeryx
 †Capromeryx arizonensis
 †Capromeryx furcifer
 †Capromeryx tauntonensis
 †Carpocyon
 †Carpocyon compressus
 †Carpocyon limosus
 †Carpocyon robustus
 †Carpocyon webbi – type locality for species
  Carya
 †Carya libbeyi
 Castor
 †Castor californicus – or unidentified comparable form
  †Castoroides
  Cedrela
 †Cedrela trainii
 †Cedromus
 †Cedromus savannae – type locality for species
 †Cedromus wardi
 Celtis
 †Celtis kansana
 †Centetodon
 †Centetodon chadronensis
 †Centetodon divaricatus – type locality for species
 †Centetodon hendryi
 †Centetodon magnus
 †Centetodon marginalis
 †Centimanomys
 †Centimanomys major
 †Cephalogale
  †Ceratogaulus
 †Ceratogaulus anecdotus
 †Ceratogaulus hatcheri
 †Ceratogaulus rhinocerus
  †Cervalces
 †Chadronia – type locality for genus
 †Chadronia margaretae – type locality for species
 †Chadronycteris
 †Chadronycteris rabenae – type locality for species
 Chaetodipus
 †Chaetodipus hispidus
 †Chamaecyparis
 †Chamaecyparis linguaefolia
 Charina
 †Charina prebottae
 †Cheilophis
 †Cheilophis huerfanoensis
 Chelydra
  †Chelydra serpentina
 †Chelydrops
 †Chelydrops stricta – type locality for species
 Chrysemys
 †Chrysemys picta
 †Chumashius
  Cladrastis
 †Cladrastis prelutea – type locality for species
 Clethrionomys
 †Clethrionomys gapperi – or unidentified comparable form
 Cnemidophorus
 †Cnemidophorus sexlineatus
 Cocculus
 †Cocculus rotunda – type locality for species
 †Colodon
 †Colodon cingulatus
 †Colodon occidentalis
 Coluber
 †Coluber constrictor
  †Conuropsis
 †Conuropsis fratercula – type locality for species
 †Copedelphys
 †Copedelphys stevensoni
 †Copemys
 †Copemys lindsayi
 †Copemys longidens
 †Copemys mariae
 †Copemys pisinnus
 †Copemys shotwelli
 †Cordia
 †Cordia prealba – type locality for species
  †Cormocyon
 †Cormocyon copei
 †Cormocyon haydeni
  †Cormohipparion
 †Cormohipparion goorisi
 †Cormohipparion johnsoni – type locality for species
 †Cormohipparion matthewi – type locality for species
 †Cormohipparion merriami – type locality for species
 †Cormohipparion occidentale
 †Cormohipparion quinni
  †Cosoryx
 †Cosoryx furcatus
  †Cranioceras
 †Cranioceras unicornis
 Crataegus
 †Crataegus nupta
 †Craterogale – type locality for genus
 †Craterogale simus – type locality for species
 Crotalus
  †Crotalus horridus
 †Crusafontina
 †Crusafontina magna
 Cryptotis
 †Crytonyx
 †Crytonyx cooki – type locality for species
 †Cupidinimus
 †Cupidinimus nebraskensis
 †Cupidinimus prattensis – type locality for species
 †Cupidinimus tertius – or unidentified comparable form
 †Cylindrodon
 †Cylindrodon nebraskensis
  †Cynarctoides
 †Cynarctoides acridens
 †Cynarctoides emryi – type locality for species
 †Cynarctoides roii
 †Cynarctus
 †Cynarctus crucidens – type locality for species
 †Cynarctus saxatilis
 †Cynarctus voorhiesi – type locality for species
  †Cynelos
 †Cynelos idoneus
 †Cynelos sinapius
 †Cynodesmus
 †Cynodesmus martini – type locality for species
 †Cynodesmus thooides
 †Cynomyoides
 †Cynomyoides vatis – type locality for species
  Cynomys
 †Cynomys niobrarius
 †Cynomys sappaensis – type locality for species
 †Cynomys spenceri – type locality for species

D

 †Dakotaophis
 †Dakotaophis greeni
 †Daphoenictis
 †Daphoenictis tedfordi
 †Daphoenodon
 †Daphoenodon falkenbachi
 †Daphoenodon niobrarensis – type locality for species
 †Daphoenodon robustum
 †Daphoenodon superbus
  †Daphoenus – type locality for genus
 †Daphoenus felinus
 †Daphoenus hartshornianus
 †Daphoenus vetus – type locality for species
 Dasypus
  †Dasypus bellus
 †Delotrochanter
 †Delotrochanter oryktes – type locality for species
 †Delotrochanter petersoni
 †Desmatippus
 †Desmatippus integer
 †Desmatippus nebrascensis – type locality for species
 †Desmatippus nebraskensis
 †Desmatippus tyleri – type locality for species
 †Desmatochoerus
 †Desmatochoerus megalodon
 †Desmatolagus
 †Desmatolagus gazini – type locality for species
 †Desmocyon
 †Desmocyon matthewi
 †Desmocyon thomsoni
  †Diceratherium
 †Diceratherium annectens
 †Diceratherium armatum
 †Diceratherium niobrarense – type locality for species
 †Diceratherium radtkei
 Dicrostonyx
  †Dicrostonyx torquatus
 †Dikkomys
 †Dikkomys matthewi – type locality for species
  †Dinictis
 †Dinictis felina
 †Dinogale
 †Dinogale siouxensis – type locality for species
  †Dinohippus
 †Dinohippus leidyanus – type locality for species
  †Dinohyus
 †Dinohyus hollandi – type locality for species
  †Diospyros
 †Diospyros miotexana – type locality for species
 †Diplolophus
 †Diplolophus insolens
  Dipodomys
 †Dipoides
 †Dipoides rexroadensis
 †Dipoides stirtoni
 †Dipoides tanneri – type locality for species
 †Dipoides williamsi
 †Dipoides wilsoni – or unidentified comparable form
 †Diprionomys
 †Diprionomys agrarius – type locality for species
 †Domnina
 †Domnina dakotensis
 †Domnina gradata
 †Domnina thompsoni
 †Domninoides
 †Domninoides mimicus
 †Domninoides valentinensis – type locality for species
 †Douglassciurus
 †Douglassciurus jeffersoni
 †Downsimus
 †Downsimus chadwicki
 †Drepanomeryx
 †Drepanomeryx falciformis – type locality for species
  †Dromomeryx
 †Dromomeryx borealis – type locality for species

E

 †Ecclesimus
 †Ecclesimus tenuiceps
 †Ectopocynus
 †Ectopocynus simplicidens – type locality for species
 †Ectypodus
 †Ectypodus lovei
 †Edaphocyon
 †Edaphocyon lautus – type locality for species
 †Ekgmowechashala
 †Ekgmowechashala philotau
 Elaphe
   †Elaphe guttata
 †Elaphe kansensis – or unidentified comparable form
 †Elaphe nebraskensis – type locality for species
 †Elaphe obsoleta
 †Elaphe vulpina
  †Elomeryx – tentative report
 Emydoidea
  †Emydoidea blandingii
 †Emydoidea hutchisoni – type locality for species
 †Enhydrocyon
 †Enhydrocyon pahinsintewakpa
 †Entoptychus
 †Entoptychus grandiplanus – type locality for species
 †Eotylopus
 †Eotylopus reedi
 †Epeiromys
 †Epeiromys spanius – type locality for species
  †Epicyon
 †Epicyon haydeni
 †Epicyon saevus
 Equus
  †Equus conversidens – or unidentified comparable form
 †Equus excelsus
 †Equus francisci
  †Equus simplicidens
 Erethizon
 †Erethizon dorsatum
 Esox
  †Eubelodon
 †Eubelodon morrilli
 †Eucastor
 †Eucastor tortus
  †Eucyon
 †Eucyon davisi
 †Eucyon skinneri – type locality for species
 †Euhapsis
 †Euhapsis breugerorum – type locality for species
 †Euhapsis ellicottae – type locality for species
 †Euhapsis platyceps – type locality for species
  Eumeces
 †Eumeces antiquus – type locality for species
 †Eumeces minimus
 †Eumeces striatulatus – or unidentified comparable form
 †Eumys
 †Eumys brachyodus
 †Eumys elegans
 †Eumys parvidens – type locality for species
 †Euoplocyon
 †Euoplocyon brachygnathus
 †Euroxenomys
 †Euroxenomys wilsoni
 †Eutypomys
 †Eutypomys thomsoni

F

 †Fanimus
 †Fanimus ultimus – type locality for species
 Felis
 †Felis rexroadensis – or unidentified comparable form
 †Florentiamys
 †Florentiamys tiptoni
 †Floridatragulus
 †Fossorcastor
 †Fossorcastor greeni – type locality for species
  †Fraxinus
 †Fraxinus coulteri

G

  †Gaillardia
 †Gaillardia thomsoni – type locality for species
 †Galbreathia
 †Galbreathia bettae
 †Galbreathia novellus
 †Galushaceras – type locality for genus
 †Galushaceras levellorum – type locality for species
 Geochelone
 †Geochelone nordensis – type locality for species
 †Geochelone oelrichi
 Geomys
  †Geomys bursarius
 †Geomys lutescens
 †Geomys quinni
 †Geomys tobinensis – or unidentified comparable form
  Geranoaetus
 †Geranoaetus contortus
 †Geringia
 †Geringia mcgregori
 †Geringophis
 †Geringophis depressus
 †Geringophis vetus – type locality for species
 †Geringophis yatkolae – type locality for species
  Gerrhonotus
 †Gerrhonotus mungerorum – or unidentified comparable form
 †Gigantocamelus
 †Gigantocamelus spatulus – type locality for species
 Glyptemys
 †Glyptemys valentinensis – type locality for species
 †Glyptosaurus
 †Goinophis – type locality for genus
 †Goinophis minusculus – type locality for species
  †Gomphotherium
 †Gomphotherium productum – type locality for species
 †Goniodontomys
 †Goniodontomys disjunctus
  Gopherus
 †Gopherus laticuneus
 Graptemys
 †Gregorymys
 †Gregorymys formosus
 †Gripholagomys
 †Gripholagomys lavocati
 Grus
 †Grus pratensis
 †Guildayomys
 †Guildayomys hibbardi – type locality for species

H

 †Harrisonsaurus – type locality for genus
 †Harrisonsaurus fossilis – type locality for species
 †Harrymys
 †Harrymys magnus
  †Hayoceros
 †Hayoceros barbouri – type locality for species
 †Helagras
 †Helagras orellanensis – type locality for species
 †Heliscomys
 †Heliscomys hatcheri
 †Heliscomys macdonaldi – type locality for species
 †Heliscomys mcgrewi – type locality for species
 †Heliscomys vetus
  †Helodermoides
 †Helodermoides tuberculatus
 †Hemiauchenia
 †Hemiauchenia macrocephala
 †Heptacodon
 †Heptacodon occidentale – or unidentified comparable form
  †Herpetotherium
 †Herpetotherium fugax
 †Herpetotherium youngi
 †Hesperhys
 †Hesperhys vagrans
  †Hesperocyon
 †Hesperocyon gregarius
 †Hesperolagomys
 †Hesperolagomys fluviatilis
 †Hesperolagomys galbreathi – or unidentified comparable form
 †Hesperoscalops
 †Hesperoscalops mcgrewi
 †Hesperotestudo
 †Hesperotestudo angusticeps – type locality for species
 †Hesperotestudo orthopygia
 Heterodon
 †Heterodon nasicus
 †Heterodon platyrhinos
 †Heteromeryx
 †Heteromeryx dispar
 †Hibbardomys
 †Hibbardomys marthae – type locality for species
 †Hibbardomys skinneri – type locality for species
 †Hibbardomys voorhiesi – type locality for species
  †Hipparion
 †Hipparion forcei
 †Hipparion tehonense
  †Hippotherium
 †Hitonkala
 †Hitonkala macdonaldtau – type locality for species
 Holbrookia – tentative report
 †Holbrookia antiqua – type locality for species
  †Homotherium
 †Homotherium crusafonti
  †Hoplophoneus
 †Hoplophoneus mentalis
 †Hoplophoneus primaevus
  †Hyaenodon
 †Hyaenodon crucians
 Hyla
 †Hyla gratiosa – or unidentified comparable form
 †Hyla squirella – or unidentified comparable form
 †Hyla versicolor – or unidentified comparable form
  †Hypertragulus
 †Hypertragulus calcaratus
 †Hypertragulus chadronensis – type locality for species
 †Hypertragulus crawfordensis – type locality for species
 †Hypertragulus minor – type locality for species
 †Hypertragulus quadratus – type locality for species
 †Hypertragulus sequens – type locality for species
 †Hypisodus
 †Hypisodus alacer
 †Hypisodus ironsi – type locality for species
 †Hypisodus minimus
 †Hypisodus paululus – type locality for species
 †Hypisodus retallacki – type locality for species
  †Hypohippus
 †Hypohippus affinis
 †Hypohippus osborni
 †Hypohippus pertinax – or unidentified comparable form
 †Hypolagus
 †Hypolagus fontinalis
 †Hypolagus furlongi
 †Hypolagus parviplicatus
 †Hypolagus regalis
 †Hypolagus ringoldensis
 †Hypolagus vetus
 †Hypolagus voorhiesi
 †Hypsiops
 †Hypsiops breviceps
  †Hyracodon
 †Hyracodon leidyanus
 †Hyracodon nebraskensis
 †Hystricops
 †Hystricops venustus

I

 Ictalurus
 †Ictalurus echinatus
 †Ictalurus lambda
 †Ictalurus leidyi – or unidentified comparable form
 †Ictalurus punctatus – or unidentified comparable form
 †Idiogenomys – type locality for genus
 †Idiogenomys ozziei – type locality for species
 Ilex
  †Indarctos
 †Indarctos oregonensis
 †Ischyrocyon
 †Ischyrocyon gidleyi
  †Ischyromys
 †Ischyromys douglassi
 †Ischyromys typus
 †Ischyromys veterior

J

 †Jimomys
 †Jimomys labaughi – type locality for species
 Juglans

K

  †Kalobatippus
 †Kalobatippus agatensis
 †Kansasimys
 Kinosternon
 †Kinosternon flavescens
 †Kirkomys
 †Kirkomys nebraskensis

L

 †Lambdoceras
 †Lambdoceras siouxensis
  Lampropeltis
 †Lampropeltis calligaster
 †Lampropeltis getulus
 †Lampropeltis similis – type locality for species
 †Lampropeltis triangulum
 †Lantanotherium
 †Lantanotherium observatum – type locality for species
  Lasiurus
 †Leidymys
 †Leidymys blacki
 †Leidymys cerasus – type locality for species
 Leiocephalus
 †Leiocephalus nebraskensis
 †Leiocephalus septentrionalis – type locality for species
 †Lemoynea
 †Lemoynea biradicularis – type locality for species
  Lepisosteus
 †Lepoides
 †Lepoides lepoides – type locality for species
 Lepomis
  †Lepomis microlophus
 †Leptarctus
 †Leptarctus martini – type locality for species
 †Leptarctus oregonensis
 †Leptarctus primus
 †Leptarctus wortmani – type locality for species
  †Leptauchenia
 †Leptauchenia decora
 †Leptauchenia major
 †Leptochoerus
 †Leptochoerus elegans
 †Leptochoerus emilyae
 †Leptochoerus spectabilis
 †Leptochoerus supremus
  †Leptocyon
 †Leptocyon gregorii – or unidentified comparable form
 †Leptocyon leidyi – type locality for species
 †Leptocyon matthewi – type locality for species
 †Leptocyon vafer
 †Leptocyon vulpinus
 †Leptodontomys
 †Leptodontomys douglassi
 †Leptodontomys stirtoni – or unidentified comparable form
   †Leptomeryx
 †Leptomeryx elissae – type locality for species
 †Leptomeryx esulcatus
 †Leptomeryx evansi
 †Leptomeryx speciosus
 †Leptotomus
 Lepus
 †Lepus californicus – or unidentified comparable form
 Lichanura
 †Lignimus
 †Lignimus montis
 †Limnoecus
 †Limnoecus compressus
 †Limnoecus niobrarensis – type locality for species
 Liquidambar
 †Longirostromeryx
 †Longirostromeryx wellsi
  Lontra
 †Loupomys
 †Lowesaurus
 †Lowesaurus matthewi
  Lycopodium

M

 †Machaeromeryx
 †Machaeromeryx tragulus – type locality for species
  †Machairodus
 Macrochelys
 †Macrochelys schmidti
 †Macrochelys temminckii
 †Macrogenis
 †Macrogenis crassigenis
 †Macrognathomys
 Mahonia
 †Mahonia marginata
 †Mammacyon
  †Mammut
 †Mammut matthewi
 †Mammuthus
  †Mammuthus columbi
 Martes
 †Martes parviloba
 †Martinogale
 †Martinogale alveodens
 Masticophis
 †Masticophis flagellum
 †Matthewlabis
 †Matthewlabis cedrensis
 †Mediochoerus
 †Mediochoerus blicki – type locality for species
 †Mediochoerus johnsoni – type locality for species
 †Megacamelus
 †Megacamelus merriami – or unidentified comparable form
  †Megahippus
 †Megahippus matthewi
 †Megahippus mckennai
 †Megalagus
 †Megalagus brachyodon
 †Megalagus primitivus
 †Megalagus turgidus
 †Megalictis
 †Megalictis ferox
 †Megalonyx
 †Megalonyx curvidens
  †Megalonyx leptostomus
  †Megantereon – tentative report
 †Megantereon hesperus
 †Megasminthus
 †Megasminthus gladiofex
 †Megasminthus tiheni
  †Megatylopus
 †Megatylopus cochrani
 †Megatylopus gigas
 †Megatylopus primaevus – or unidentified comparable form
 †Meliakrouniomys
 †Meliosma
 †Meliosma predentata – type locality for species
 †Meniscomys
  †Menoceras
 †Menoceras arikarense – type locality for species
 †Menoceras barbouri
 Mephitis
 †Mephitis mephitis
  †Merychippus
 †Merychippus calamarius – or unidentified comparable form
 †Merychippus coloradense
 †Merychippus insignis
 †Merychippus primus
 †Merychippus quintus
 †Merychippus republicanus
   †Merychyus
 †Merychyus arenarum
 †Merychyus crabilli – type locality for species
 †Merychyus elegans
 †Merychyus minimus – type locality for species
 †Merychyus novomexicanus
 †Merychyus relictus
 †Merychyus siouxensis – or unidentified comparable form
  †Merycochoerus
 †Merycochoerus magnus – type locality for species
 †Merycochoerus matthewi
 †Merycochoerus proprius
  †Merycodus
 †Merycodus necatus
 †Merycodus prodromus – type locality for species
 †Merycodus sabulonis
 †Merycodus warreni
 †Merycoides
 †Merycoides longiceps
  †Merycoidodon
 †Merycoidodon bullatus
 †Merycoidodon culbertsoni – type locality for species
 †Merycoidodon major
  †Mesocyon – report made of unidentified related form or using admittedly obsolete nomenclature
 †Mesocyon temnodon
 †Mesogaulus
 †Mesogaulus paniensis
  †Mesohippus
 †Mesohippus bairdi
  †Mesoreodon
 †Mesoreodon chelonyx
 †Mesoreodon minor
 †Mesoscalops
 †Mesoscalops scopelotemos
 †Metadjidaumo
 †Metadjidaumo hendryi – or unidentified comparable form
  †Metailurus
 †Metalopex
 †Metalopex merriami
 †Metatomarctus
 †Metatomarctus canavus
 †Metechinus
 †Metechinus amplior
 †Michenia
 †Michenia agatensis – type locality for species
 †Micronatrix – type locality for genus
 †Micronatrix juliescottae – type locality for species
 †Micropternodus
 †Micropternodus borealis
 †Micropternodus montrosensis – type locality for species
 Micropterus
 †Microtomarctus
 †Microtomarctus conferta
 Microtus
 †Microtus ochrogaster
 †Microtus pennsylvanicus
 Micrurus
 Mictomys
 †Mictomys kansasensis
 †Mictomys meltoni
 †Mictomys vetus – or unidentified comparable form
 †Migmacastor – type locality for genus
 †Migmacastor procumbodens – type locality for species
  †Miniochoerus
 †Miniochoerus affinis
 †Miniochoerus chadronensis
 †Miniochoerus forsythae
 †Miniochoerus gracilis
 †Miniochoerus helprini – type locality for species
 †Miniochoerus starkensis – type locality for species
 †Mioheteromys
 †Mioheteromys amplissimus – type locality for species
 †Mioheteromys subterior – type locality for species
  †Miohippus
 †Miohippus intermedius – or unidentified comparable form
 †Miolabis
 †Miolabis princetonianus – type locality for species
 †Miomustela
 †Miomustela madisonae
 †Mionictis
 †Mionictis elegans – type locality for species
 †Mionictis incertus – type locality for species
 †Mionictis letifer – type locality for species
 †Mionictis pristinus
 †Miosicista
 †Miosicista angulus – type locality for species
 †Miospermophilus
 †Miospermophilus bryanti
 †Miospermophilus wyomingensis
 †Miotapirus
 †Miotapirus harrisonensis
 †Miotylopus
 †Miotylopus gibbi
 †Miotylopus leonardi
 †Monosaulax
 †Monosaulax curtus
 †Monosaulax pansus
 †Monosaulax skinneri – type locality for species
 †Monosaulax tedi – type locality for species
 †Mookomys
 †Mookomys altifluminis
 †Mookomys altifluminus
  †Moropus
 †Moropus elatus
 †Moropus hollandi – type locality for species
 †Moropus merriami
 Mustela
 †Mustela frenata
 †Mustela nigripes
 †Mustela rexroadensis – or unidentified comparable form
 †Mustela vison
 Mycteria
 †Mycteria milleri
 †Mylagaulus
 †Mylagaulus cambridgensis
  †Mylohyus
 Myodes
 Myotis
 †Mystipterus
 †Mystipterus martini

N

 †Namatomys
 †Namatomys lloydi
  †Nannippus
 †Nannippus lenticularis
 †Nanodelphys
 †Nanodelphys hunti
 †Nanotragulus
 †Nanotragulus loomisi
 †Nanotragulus ordinatus
 Natrix – or unidentified comparable form
 †Nebraskomys
 †Nebraskomys mcgrewi – type locality for species
 †Nebraskophis – type locality for genus
 †Nebraskophis skinneri – type locality for species
  †Neohipparion
 †Neohipparion affine
 †Neohipparion eurystyle – or unidentified comparable form
 †Neohipparion leptode
 †Neohipparion trampasense
 †Neonatrix – type locality for genus
 †Neonatrix elongata – type locality for species
 †Neonatrix infera – or unidentified comparable form
 †Neonatrix magna – type locality for species
  Neophrontops
 †Neophrontops vetustus – type locality for species
 Neotamias
  Neotoma
 †Neotoma quadriplicata – or unidentified comparable form
 †Neotoma sawrockensis – or unidentified comparable form
 †Neotragocerus
 †Neotragocerus improvisus – type locality for species
  Nerodia
 †Nerodia hillmani
 †Nerodia rhombifera
  †Nerodia sipedon
 †Nexuotapirus
 †Nexuotapirus marslandensis – type locality for species
  †Nimravides
 †Nimravides galiani
 †Nimravides pedionomus – type locality for species
 †Nimravides thinobates
 †Nordenosaurus
 †Nordenosaurus magnus – type locality for species
 †Nothodipoides
 †Nothodipoides planus
 †Nothodipoides stirtoni – type locality for species
 †Nothotylopus
 †Nototamias
 †Nototamias quadratus – type locality for species
 †Nyssa
 †Nyssa copeana

O

 †Ocajila
 †Ocajila makpiyahe
 Ochotona
 †Ochotona spanglei – or unidentified comparable form
 Odocoileus
  †Odocoileus virginianus
 Ogmodontomys
 †Ogmodontomys poaphagus
 †Ogmophis
 †Ogmophis compactus
 †Ogmophis miocompactus
 †Oligobunis
 †Oligomyotis
 †Oligoryctes
 †Oligoryctes cameronensis
 †Oligoscalops
 †Oligoscalops galbreathi
 †Oligospermophilus
 †Oligospermophilus douglassi
  Ondatra
 †Ondatra annectens – or unidentified comparable form
 †Ondatra idahoensis
 †Ondatra meadensis
 †Ondatra zibethicus
 Onychomys
 †Onychomys larabeei – or unidentified comparable form
 †Onychomys leucogaster – or unidentified comparable form
 †Onychomys pedroensis – or unidentified comparable form
 Opheodrys – or unidentified comparable form
 †Ophiomys
 †Ophiomys fricki
 †Ophiomys magilli
 †Ophiomys parvus
 Ophisaurus
  †Ophisaurus ventralis
 †Orelladjidaumo
 †Orelladjidaumo xylodes – type locality for species
 †Oreolagus
 †Oreolagus nebrascensis – type locality for species
 †Oropyctis
 †Oropyctis pediasius – type locality for species
  Ortalis
 †Ortalis tantala – type locality for species
 †Osbornodon
 †Osbornodon fricki
 †Osbornodon iamonensis
 †Osbornodon renjiei
 †Oxetocyon
 †Oxetocyon cuspidatus
  †Oxydactylus
 †Oxydactylus longipes

P

 †Paciculus
 †Paciculus nebraskensis – type locality for species
 †Paenemarmota
 †Paenemarmota barbouri
 †Paenemarmota nevadensis – or unidentified comparable form
 †Paenemarmota sawrockensis
 †Palaealectoris – type locality for genus
 †Palaealectoris incertus – type locality for species
 †Palaeastur – type locality for genus
 †Palaeastur atavus – type locality for species
  †Palaeocastor
  †Palaeogale
 †Palaeogale dorothiae
 †Palaeogale minuta – or unidentified comparable form
  †Palaeolagus
 †Palaeolagus burkei
 †Palaeolagus haydeni – type locality for species
 †Palaeolagus hemirhizis – type locality for species
 †Palaeolagus hypsodus
 †Palaeolagus intermedius
 †Palaeolagus philoi
 †Palaeolagus temnodon
 †Paleoheterodon – type locality for genus
 †Paleoheterodon tiheni – type locality for species
 Panthera
  †Panthera leo
 †Parablastomeryx
 †Parablastomeryx gregorii – type locality for species
 †Paracoluber
 †Paracoluber storeri
 †Paracosoryx
 †Paracosoryx dawesensis
 †Paracosoryx wilsoni
 †Paracryptotis
 †Paractiornis – type locality for genus
 †Paractiornis perpusillus – type locality for species
 †Paracynarctus
 †Paracynarctus kelloggi
 †Paracynarctus sinclairi – type locality for species
 †Paradaphoenus
 †Paradaphoenus minimus
 †Paradaphoenus tooheyi – type locality for species
 †Paradjidaumo
 †Paradjidaumo trilophus
 †Paradjidaumo validus – type locality for species
 †Paraenhydrocyon
 †Paraenhydrocyon wallovianus
 †Paragerrhonotus – or unidentified comparable form
 †Paragerrhonotus ricardensis
   †Parahippus
 †Parahippus atavus
 †Parahippus cognatus
 †Parallomys
 †Parallomys americanus – type locality for species
 †Paramerychyus
 †Paramerychyus harrisonensis
 †Paramerychyus relictus
 †Paramicrotoscoptes
 †Paramicrotoscoptes hibbardi
 †Paramiolabis
 †Paramiolabis tenuis
  †Paramylodon
 †Paramylodon harlani
 †Paramys
 †Paramys relictus
 †Paranamatomys
 †Paranamatomys storeri
 †Parapliosaccomys
 †Parapliosaccomys annae
 †Parapliosaccomys hibbardi
  Parascalops – or unidentified comparable form
 †Parataxidea – or unidentified comparable form
 †Paratomarctus
 †Paratomarctus euthos
 †Paratomarctus temerarius
  †Paratylopus
 †Paratylopus labiatus
 †Paratylopus primaevus
 †Parictis
 †Parictis gilpini
 †Paronychomys
 †Parophisaurus
 †Parophisaurus pawneensis
 †Parvericius
 †Parvericius montanus
 †Parvericius voorhiesi – type locality for species
 †Parvitragulus – tentative report
 †Pediohierax – type locality for genus
 †Pediohierax ramenta – type locality for species
 †Pediolophodon
 †Pediomeryx
 †Pediomeryx hemphillensis – or unidentified comparable form
  †Peltosaurus
 †Peltosaurus granulosus
 †Pelycomys
 †Pelycomys brulanus – type locality for species
 †Pelycomys placidus – or unidentified comparable form
 †Penetrigonias
 †Penetrigonias dakotensis – type locality for species
 †Peraceras
 †Peraceras profectum
 †Peraceras superciliosum
 †Perchoerus
 †Perchoerus probus – tentative report
 †Peridiomys
 †Peridiomys borealis
 †Peridiomys rusticus – type locality for species
  Perognathus
 †Perognathus brevidens
 †Perognathus coquorum
 †Perognathus furlongi – or unidentified comparable form
 †Perognathus minutus – or unidentified comparable form
 †Perognathus pearlettensis
 †Perognathus trojectioansrum
  Peromyscus
 †Peromyscus kansasensis – or unidentified comparable form
 †Petauristodon
 †Petenyia – or unidentified comparable form
  †Phasianus
 †Phasianus mioceanus – type locality for species
 †Phelosaccomys
  †Phenacocoelus
 †Phenacocoelus typus – type locality for species
 Phenacomys
 †Phenacomys intermedius – or unidentified comparable form
  †Phlaocyon
 †Phlaocyon annectens
 †Phlaocyon leucosteus
 †Phlaocyon mariae – type locality for species
 †Phlaocyon marslandensis
 †Phlaocyon minor
 †Phlaocyon yatkolai – type locality for species
 Phrynosoma
  †Phrynosoma cornutum
 Picea
 Pinus
 †Pipestoneomys
 †Pipestoneomys bisulcatus
 Pituophis
 †Pituophis catenifer
 †Pituophis melanoleucus
 †Planisorex
 †Planisorex dixonensis
 Platanus
 †Platanus vitifolia – type locality for species
  †Platybelodon
 †Platybelodon barnumbrowni
 †Platybelodon loomisi
  †Platygonus
 †Platygonus compressus
 †Platygonus pollenae – type locality for species
 †Pleiolama
 †Pleiolama mckennai – type locality for species
 †Pleiolama vera – or unidentified comparable form
 †Plesiogulo
 †Plesiogulo lindsayi – or unidentified comparable form
 †Plesiosorex
 †Plesiosorex coloradensis
 †Plesiosorex donroosai
 †Plesiosorex greeni
 †Pleurolicus
 †Pleurolicus exiguus – type locality for species
 †Pleurolicus hemingfordensis
 †Pleurolicus sulcifrons – or unidentified comparable form
 †Pliauchenia
 †Pliauchenia magnifontis
 †Plioceros
 †Plioceros dehlini – type locality for species
 †Plioceros floblairi – type locality for species
 †Pliocyon
 †Pliocyon medius – type locality for species
 †Pliogale
 †Pliogale furlongi
 †Pliogeomys
 †Pliogeomys russelli – type locality for species
  †Pliohippus
 †Pliohippus mirabilis
 †Pliohippus nobilis
 †Pliohippus pernix
 †Pliolemmus
 †Pliolemmus antiquus
 †Pliometanastes
 †Plionarctos
 †Plionictis
 †Plionictis ogygia
 †Pliophenacomys
 †Pliophenacomys osborni
 †Pliophenacomys primaevus
 †Pliosaccomys
 †Pliotaxidea
 †Pliotaxidea garberi
 †Pliotaxidea nevadensis
 †Pliozapus
 †Pliozapus solus – or unidentified comparable form
  †Plithocyon
  †Poebrotherium
 †Poebrotherium eximium
 †Poebrotherium wilsoni
  †Pogonodon
 †Pogonodon brachyops
  Populus
 †Populus crassa
 †Populus gallowayi – type locality for species
 †Populus washoensis
 †Potamonycteris – type locality for genus
 †Potamonycteris biperforatus – type locality for species
 †Priusaulax
 †Priusaulax browni – type locality for species
 †Proantilocapra
 †Proantilocapra platycornea – type locality for species
 †Probassariscus
 †Probassariscus matthewi
 †Problastomeryx
 †Problastomeryx primus
  †Procamelus
 †Procamelus grandis
 †Procamelus leptocolon
 †Procamelus occidentalis
 †Procastoroides
 †Procastoroides idahoensis
 †Procastoroides sweeti – type locality for species
  †Procranioceras
 †Procranioceras skinneri
 †Prodipodomys
 †Prodipoides
 †Prodipoides burgensis – type locality for species
 †Prodipoides dividerus
 †Prodipoides katensis
 †Proharrymys
 †Proharrymys fedti
 †Proharrymys schlaikjeri
 †Proharrymys wahlerti – type locality for species
 †Proheteromys
 †Proheteromys ironcloudi
 †Promartes
 †Promartes darbyi
 †Promartes lepidus – or unidentified comparable form
 †Promartes olcotti – type locality for species
  †Promerycochoerus
 †Promerycochoerus carrikeri
 †Promerycochoerus superbus
 †Promilio
 †Promilio efferus – type locality for species
 †Promylagaulus
 †Promylagaulus riggsi
 †Pronotolagus
 †Pronotolagus albus
 †Pronotolagus apachensis
 †Pronotolagus whitei – type locality for species
 †Proscalops
 †Proscalops miocaenus – or unidentified comparable form
 †Proscalops secundus
 †Proscalops tertius
 †Prosciurus
 †Prosciurus albiclivus
 †Prosciurus dawsonae
 †Prosciurus magnus – type locality for species
 †Prosciurus parvus – type locality for species
 †Prosciurus vetustus
 †Prosomys
 †Prosomys mimus
 †Prosthennops
 †Prosthennops niobrarensis
 †Prosthennops serus
 †Prosthennops xiphodonticus
 †Prosynthetoceras
 †Protemnocyon – type locality for genus
 †Protemnocyon inflatus – type locality for species
 †Proterix
 †Proterix bicuspis
  †Protoceras
 †Protoceras skinneri
  †Protohippus
 †Protohippus gidleyi
 †Protohippus perditus
 †Protohippus supremus
 †Protolabis
 †Protolabis gracilis – or unidentified comparable form
 †Protolabis heterodontus
 †Protolabis saxeus – type locality for species
 †Protomarctus
 †Protomarctus optatus
 †Protoprocyon
 †Protoprocyon savagei – type locality for species
 †Protosciurus
 †Protosciurus mengi – type locality for species
 †Protospermophilus
 †Protospermophilus kelloggi
 †Protospermophilus quatalensis – or unidentified comparable form
  Prunus
 †Prunus acuminata – type locality for species
 †Psalidocyon
 †Psalidocyon marianae
  Pseudacris
 †Pseudacris clarki – or unidentified comparable form
 †Pseudacris nordensis – type locality for species
  †Pseudaelurus
 †Pseudaelurus aeluroides – type locality for species
 †Pseudaelurus intrepdius – or unidentified comparable form
 †Pseudaelurus intrepidus
 †Pseudaelurus marshi – type locality for species
 †Pseudaelurus stouti
 †Pseudaelurus validus
  †Pseudhipparion
 †Pseudhipparion gratum – type locality for species
 †Pseudhipparion retrusum
 †Pseudhipparion skinneri
 †Pseudoblastomeryx
 †Pseudoblastomeryx advena – type locality for species
 †Pseudoceras
 †Pseudoceras skinneri – type locality for species
 †Pseudocylindrodon
 †Pseudocylindrodon neglectus
 †Pseudocyon
 †Pseudolabis
 †Pseudolabis dakotensis
 †Pseudomyscus
 †Pseudomyscus bathygnathus – type locality for species
 †Pseudoparablastomeryx
 †Pseudoparablastomeryx francescita
 †Pseudoparablastomeryx scotti
  †Pseudoprotoceras
 †Pseudoprotoceras longinaris – type locality for species
 †Pseudotheridomys
 †Pseudotrimylus
 †Pseudotrimylus blacki – type locality for species
 †Pseudotrimylus roperi
  Pterocarya
 †Pterocarya oregoniana
 †Pterogaulus
 †Pterogaulus barbarellae – type locality for species
 †Pterogaulus laevis
 †Pterygoboa
 †Pterygoboa miocenica
 †Pylodictis
  †Pylodictis olivaris

Q

  Quercus
 †Quercus argentum
 †Quercus parvula – type locality for species
 †Quercus preturbinella – type locality for species
 †Quercus remingtoni

R

 †Rakomeryx
 †Rakomeryx sinclairi
  †Ramoceros
 †Ramoceros osborni
 †Rana
 †Rana catesbeiana
 †Rana clamitans
 †Rana pipiens
 †Rana sylvatica
 †Regina
 †Regina grahami
 Reithrodontomys
 †Reithrodontomys pratincola
 †Repomys
 †Repomys gustelyi
  Rhineura
 †Rhineura hatcherii
 †Rhineura marslandensis – type locality for species
 Rhinocheilus
 †Rhinocheilus lecontei
  †Ribes
 †Ribes infrequens – type locality for species
 †Robinia
 †Robinia lesquereuxi
 †Russellagus
 †Russellagus vonhofi

S

  Salix
 Salvadora
 †Salvadora paleolineata – type locality for species
 †Sanctimus
 †Sanctimus falkenbachi – type locality for species
 †Sanctimus stouti – or unidentified comparable form
 †Sanctimus stuartae
 †Sarcobatus – or unidentified comparable form
  †Satherium
 †Satherium piscinarium
 †Scalopoides
 †Scalopoides hutchisoni – type locality for species
 †Scalopoides isodens
 †Scalopoides ripafodiator
 Scalopus
  †Scalopus aquaticus
 Scaphiopus
 †Scaphiopus wardorum – type locality for species
  †Scaphohippus
 †Scaphohippus intermontanus
 †Scaphohippus sumani
 Sceloporus
 †Sceloporus robustus
 †Sceloporus undulatus
 †Schaubeumys
 †Schaubeumys cartomylos
 †Schaubeumys clivosus
 †Schaubeumys grangeri
 †Schaubeumys sabrae
 †Schizodontomys
 †Schizodontomys amnicolus – type locality for species
 †Schizodontomys harkseni – or unidentified comparable form
 †Scottimus
 †Scottimus lophatus – type locality for species
 †Scottimus viduus – type locality for species
 Sequoia – or unidentified comparable form
 †Serbelodon
 †Serbelodon barbourensis
  †Sespia
 †Sespia nitida
  Sigmodon
 †Sigmodon minor
 †Simimys – tentative report
 †Sinclairella
 †Sinclairella dakotensis
 †Sinclairomeryx
 †Sinclairomeryx riparius – type locality for species
 Siren
 Sistrurus
 †Sistrurus catenatus
 †Skinnerhyus – type locality for genus
 †Skinnerhyus shermerorum – type locality for species
 †Skinneroceras – type locality for genus
 †Skinneroceras manningi – type locality for species
  †Smilodon
 †Smilodon fatalis – or unidentified comparable form
 †Sminthosinis
 Sorex
 †Sorex arcticus
 †Sorex cinereus
 †Sorex edwardsi – type locality for species
  †Sorex palustris
 †Sorex sandersi
 †Sorex yatkolai – type locality for species
 Spea
  †Spea bombifrons
 †Spea neuter
 Spermophilus
 †Spermophilus boothi
 †Spermophilus cyanocittus – type locality for species
 †Spermophilus elegans
 †Spermophilus franklinii – or unidentified comparable form
 †Spermophilus johnstoni
 †Spermophilus matthewi – type locality for species
 †Spermophilus meltoni
 †Spermophilus richardsonii
 †Spermophilus shotwelli – or unidentified comparable form
  †Spermophilus tridecemlineatus
 †Sphenophalos
 †Sphenophalos middleswarti – type locality for species
 Spizaetus
 †Spizaetus tanneri – type locality for species
  †Stegomastodon
 †Stegomastodon aftoniae
 †Stegomastodon primitivus
 †Stehlinia – tentative report
 †Steneofiber
 †Steneofiber barbouri
 †Steneofiber fossor
  †Stenomylus
 †Stenomylus crassipes – type locality for species
 †Stenomylus gracilis
 †Stenomylus hitchcocki – type locality for species
 Sthenictis
 †Sthenictis bellus – type locality for species
 †Sthenictis dolichops – type locality for species
 †Stibarus
 †Stibarus obtusilobus
 †Stibarus quadricuspis
 †Stratimus
 †Stratimus strobeli – type locality for species
 †Stuckyhyus
 †Stuckyhyus siouxensis – type locality for species
 †Stylemys
 †Stylemys nebrascensis
  †Subdromomeryx
 †Subdromomeryx antilopinus
  †Subhyracodon
 †Subhyracodon mitis
 †Submeryceros
 †Submeryceros minor
 †Sunkahetanka
 †Sunkahetanka geringensis
 Sylvilagus
 †Sylvilagus floridanus
 Synaptomys
 †Synaptomys cooperi
 †Syndyoceras
 †Syndyoceras cooki – type locality for species
  †Synthetoceras
 †Synthetoceras tricornatus

T

 Tamias
 †Tamias ateles
 †Tanymykter
 †Tanymykter brachyodontus
 †Tanymykter longirostris – type locality for species
  Tapirus
 †Tapirus johnsoni – type locality for species
 †Tapirus polkensis – or unidentified comparable form
 †Tapirus simpsoni
 Taxidea
  †Taxidea taxus
  †Teleoceras
 †Teleoceras americanum
 †Teleoceras fossiger
 †Teleoceras hicksi
 †Teleoceras major – type locality for species
 †Teleoceras medicornutum
 †Teleoceras meridianum
 †Temnocyon
 †Temnocyon percussor – type locality for species
 †Temnocyon typicus – type locality for species
 †Temperocastor
 †Temperocastor valentinensis
 †Tenudomys
 †Tenudomys basilaris – type locality for species
 †Tenudomys ridgeviewensis – type locality for species
 †Tenudomys titanus
 †Tephrocyon
 †Tephrocyon scitulus
 Terrapene
 †Terrapene corneri – type locality for species
  †Terrapene ornata – type locality for species
 †Tetrabelodon
 †Tetrabelodon osborni
 †Texasophis
 †Texoceros
 †Texoceros altidens – type locality for species
 †Texoceros guymonensis
 Thamnophis
 †Thamnophis proximus
  †Thamnophis radix
 †Thamnophis sirtalis
  †Thinobadistes
 †Thinohyus
  Thomomys
 †Thylacaelurus
 †Thylacaelurus montanus
  †Ticholeptus
 †Ticholeptus zygomaticus
 Tilia
  †Titanotylopus
 †Titanotylopus nebraskensis – type locality for species
  †Tomarctus
 †Tomarctus brevirostris
 †Tomarctus hippophaga – type locality for species
 Trachemys
 †Trachemys inflata – or unidentified comparable form
 †Tregophis
 †Tregophis brevirachis
 †Trigenicus
 †Trigenicus profectus
  †Trigonias
 †Trigonias osborni
 †Trigonias wellsi
 †Trigonictis
 †Trigonictis cookii
 †Trigonictis macrodon
 †Trilaccogaulus
 †Trilaccogaulus ovatus
 Trionyx
 †Trionyx quinni – type locality for species
 Tropidoclonion – or unidentified comparable form
 †Tylionomys
 †Tylionomys voorhiesi – type locality for species
 †Tylionomys woodi
 †Tylocephalonyx
 †Tylocephalonyx skinneri – type locality for species

U

  Ulmus
 †Ulmus speciosa
 †Umbogaulus
 †Umbogaulus galushai – type locality for species
 †Umbogaulus monodon – type locality for species
 †Untermannerix
 †Untermannerix copiosus
  Urocyon
 †Ursavus
 †Ursavus brevirhinus – or unidentified comparable form
 †Urubitinga
 †Urubitinga enecta – type locality for species
 †Ustatochoerus
 †Ustatochoerus major
 †Ustatochoerus medius

V

  Vitis
 †Vitis pannosa – type locality for species
 Vulpes
 †Vulpes stenognathus
  †Vulpes velox

W

 †Wilsoneumys
 †Wilsoneumys planidens
 †Wrightohyus
 †Wrightohyus yatkolai

Y

 †Yatkolamys
 †Yatkolamys edwardsi – type locality for species
  †Ysengrinia
 †Ysengrinia americana
 †Yumaceras
 †Yumaceras figginsi

Z

 Zapus
 †Zapus hudsonius
 †Zapus sandersi
 †Zemiodontomys
 †Zemiodontomys burkei
 †Zetamys
 †Zetamys nebraskensis
 †Ziamys
 †Ziamys hugeni
 †Zodiolestes
 †Zodiolestes daimonelixensis – type locality for species
   †Zygolophodon

References
 

Cenozoic
Nebraska
Nebraska-related lists